The Kyiv football derby is a football match and the main city derby in the city of Kyiv between teams of Dynamo and Arsenal (including when it was named as FC CSCA Kyiv and CSKA-Borysfen).

The derby appeared for the first time when CSKA-Borysfen made it to the Ukrainian Higher League (Vyshcha Liha) in 1995. On 27 August 1995, Dynamo was hosting the Arsenal's predecessor CSKA-Borysfen and tied the game at 0. The game took place at the Republican Stadium.

Statistics

References

External links 
 FC Dynamo Kyiv official site
 Arsenal Kyiv official Website
 "Arsenal-Kyiv": Kyiv derby is the event to enjoy football («Арсенал-Київ»: київське дербі - це подія для насолоди футболом). Kiev 1927. 29 September 2018
 About importance of the derby: "Arsenal" – "Dynamo". Before the game (Про важливість дербі: "Арсенал" - "Динамо". Перед матчем). FC Dynamo Kyiv website. 24 November 2007
 "Arsenal" in the f** face. The Dynamo's fans offended opponents during the derby («Арсеналу» по ...». Фанати «Динамо» під час дербі образили суперників (відео)). Glavcom. 1 October 2018

Ukrainian football derbies
FC Dynamo Kyiv
Dynamo Kyiv rivalry